Weining may refer to:

Li Weining (born 1959), acting mayor of the city of Jiaxing, Zhejiang Province, China
Lin Weining (born 1979), female Chinese weightlifter and Olympic gold medalist
Frederick Weining (born 1965),  role-playing game designer
Weining Yi Hui and Miao Autonomous County, Guizhou, China